Operation Sharp Guard was a multi-year joint naval blockade in the Adriatic Sea by NATO and the Western European Union on shipments to the former Yugoslavia. Warships and maritime patrol aircraft from 14 countries were involved in searching for and stopping blockade runners.

The operation began on 15 June 1993. It was suspended on 19 June 1996, and was terminated on 2 October 1996.

Background

The operation replaced naval blockades Operation Maritime Guard (of NATO; begun by the U.S. in November 1992) and Sharp Fence (of the WEU). It put them under a single chain of command and control (the "Adriatic Military Committee", over which the NATO and WEU Councils exerted joint control), to address what their respective Councils viewed as wasteful duplication of effort. Some maintain that despite the nominal official joint command and control of the operation, in reality it was NATO staff that ran the operation.

Purpose
The operation's purpose was, through a blockade on shipments to the former Yugoslavia, to enforce economic sanctions and an arms embargo of weapons and military equipment against the former Federal Republic of Yugoslavia, and rival factions in Croatia and Bosnia.  The Yugoslav Wars were being waged, and the participants hoped to limit the fighting by limiting supplies to it.

Blockade
Fourteen nations contributed ships and patrol aircraft to the operation. At any given time, 22 ships and 8 aircraft were enforcing the blockade, with ships from Standing Naval Force Atlantic and Standing Naval Force Mediterranean establishing a rotating duty. (Belgium, Canada, Denmark, France, Germany, Greece, Italy, the Netherlands, Norway, Portugal, Spain, Turkey, the U.K., and the U.S.), and eight maritime patrol aircraft, were involved in searching for and stopping blockade runners.
Most contributors to the operation supplied one or two ships. The Turkish Navy, for example, participated with frigates, submarines, and tankers.

The operational area was divided into a series of "sea boxes", each the responsibility of a single warship.  Each boarding team was composed of a "guard team" to board and wrest control of the target ship, and a "search team", to conduct the search.

The ships were authorized to board, inspect, and seize both ships seeking to break the blockade and their cargo.  The Combined Task Force 440 was commanded by Admiral Mario Angeli of Italy.  It marked the first time since its founding in 1949 that NATO was involved in combat operations.

Jadran Express incident 
On 11 March 1994, a combined British and Italian intelligence operation led to the capture of the Maltese merchant ship Jadran Express by the Italian frigate Zeffiro, which forced the freighter into the port of Taranto. The ship had departed from Odessa bound to Venice with a cache of 2,000 tons of Soviet-designed weaponry, valued at US $200 million. Manned by Italian marines from the San Marco battalion, the Jadran Express was eventually escorted by Zeffiro to the naval base of La Maddalena, where her cargo was unloaded under heavy security.

Lido II incident

The issue of differing views among nations in the coalition as to the use of force authorized by rules of engagement arose in April 1994.  Faced with the Maltese tanker Lido II making its way towards a Montenegrin port with 45,000 tons of fuel oil, the American cruiser USS Philippine Sea asked the NATO commander (a British Commodore) for guidance, and received authorization to use "disabling fire" to stop the tanker, if necessary.  He received confirmation that he should follow the British commodore's guidance from his own higher authority. Under U.S. Navy standards, "disabling fire" means firing rounds into the ship's engineering space. The U.S. cruiser was about to pass the order along to the Dutch  HNLMS Van Kinsbergen. However, the fact that the Dutch definition of "disabling fire" involves launching rounds into the bridge of the target ship, with an increased risk of loss of life, became important. The ship was boarded by Dutch Marines inserted by helicopter from HNLMS Van Kinsbergen and eventually stopped without firing a shot on the first of May. Three Yugoslav Navy  corvettes challenged the NATO operation and one of them tried to ram the British frigate  as it was assisting Van Kinsberger. The corvettes eventually fled following the reaction of the British warship, supported by Italian Tornado aircraft which scrambled from an airbase at Gioia Del Colle. Lido II had to undergo repairs before being diverted to Italy, since the crew had sabotaged the ship's engine room. The leaking was contained by an engineer party from HMS Chatham. Seven Yugoslav stowaways were found on board. A similar incident had taken place off Montenegro a year before, on 8 February 1993, when a boarding party from the Italian frigate Espero forcibly seized the Maltese freighter Dimitrakis, which feigned an emergency in order to divert her route to the port of Bar. The merchant was smuggling coal to the Serbs from Romania.

Suspension

The blockade was suspended following a UN decision to end the arms embargo, and NATO's Southern Command said that: "NATO and WEU ships will no longer challenge, board or divert ships in the Adriatic". The Independent warned at the time that "In theory, there could now be a massive influx of arms to Bosnia, Croatia and the Federal Republic of Yugoslavia (Serbia and Montenegro), although senior military and diplomatic sources yesterday said that they thought this would be unlikely."

Applicable UN resolutions
The blockade was conducted in accordance with numerous United Nations Security Council Resolutions:  UNSCR 713, UNSCR 757, UNSCR 787 UNSCR 820, and UNSCR 943.  Resolution 787 authorized participating states to "use such measures ... as may be necessary ... to halt all inward and outward maritime shipping ... to insure strict implementation of" the arms embargo and economic sanctions against the former Yugoslavia.  Over the course of the operation, the blockade was redefined in accordance with UNSCR 1021 and UNSCR 1022.

Ships participating (Extract)

 Belgian Navy:
 
 
 Canadian Forces Maritime Command:
 
 
 
 
 
 
 
 
 Royal Danish Navy:
 HDMS Niels Juel
 French Navy:
 Commandant Blaison
 
 
 Premier Maitre L'HER
 CDT de Pimodan
 German Navy:
 Emden
 Rheinland-Pfalz
 Rommel
 Niedersachsen
 Hellenic Navy:
 
 
  
 
 Italian Navy:
 Espero
 Euro
 Fenice
 Libeccio
 Grecale
 Luigi Durand de la Penne
 Lupo
 Zeffiro
 Royal Netherlands Navy:
 HNLMS Jacob van Heemskerk
 
 HNLMS Karel Doorman
 HNLMS Abraham van der Hulst
 
 
 HNLMS Pieter Florisz
 HNLMS Van Kinsbergen
 HNLMS Witte de With
 HNLMS Zuiderkruis (A832)
 Portuguese Navy:
 
 Spanish Navy:
 
 
 
 
 
 Royal Norwegian Navy:
 
 Turkish Navy:
 
 TCG Kocatepe
 Royal Navy:
 
 
 
 
 
 
 

 
 
 
 U.S. Navy:

See also

 Yugoslav Wars
Legal assessments of the Gaza flotilla raid

References

External links

 Security Council resolutions
 UN Security Council Official Website, including all resolutions
 NATO Regional HQ Allied Forces Southern Europe Fact Sheet on Operation Sharp Guard
 Update on Operation Sharp Guard, December 1995
 General Framework Agreement
 "Evolution of the Conflict", NATO Handbook, December 18, 2002
"Operation Sharp Guard: the sea embargo of Serbia and Montenegro", Barberan, J. F., Revista de Aeronáutica y Astronáutica, no. 727, pp. 750–57. October 2003

Naval operations of the European Union
NATO intervention in the former Yugoslavia
United Nations operations in the former Yugoslavia
Blockades involving the United States
Blockades
Battles and conflicts without fatalities
1993 in Yugoslavia
1994 in Yugoslavia
1995 in Yugoslavia
1996 in Yugoslavia
1993 in Europe
1994 in Europe
1995 in Europe
1996 in Europe
Military history of the Mediterranean
Military operations of the Yugoslav Wars involving Germany
Blockades involving the United Kingdom
Military operations involving the United States